A nacelle is a "streamlined body, sized according to what it contains", such as an engine, fuel, or equipment on an aircraft. When attached by a pylon entirely outside the airframe, it is sometimes called a pod, in which case it is attached with a pylon or strut and the engine is known as a podded engine. In some cases—for instance in the typical "Farman" type "pusher" aircraft, or the World War II-era P-38 Lightning—an aircraft cockpit may also be housed in a nacelle, rather than in a conventional fuselage.

Etymology
Like many aviation terms, the word comes from French, in this case from a word for a small boat.

Development 

The Arado Ar 234 was one of the first operational jet aircraft with engines mounted in nacelles. During its development, the four jet engines were merged from having four distinct nacelles, all of which contained their own landing gear wheel, to two nacelles with two engines each.

In recent years, General Electric and NASA have developed nacelles with chevron-shaped trailing edges to reduce the engine noise of commercial aircraft, using an experimental Boeing 777 as a test platform.

Applications

Usually, multi-engined aircraft use nacelles for housing the engines. Combat aircraft (such as the Eurofighter Typhoon) usually have the engines mounted within the fuselage. Some engines are installed in the aircraft wing, as in the De Havilland Comet and Flying Wing type aircraft. Engines may be mounted in individual nacelles, or in the case of larger aircraft such as the Boeing B-52 Stratofortress (pictured right) may have two engines mounted in a single nacelle. Nacelles can be made fully or partially detachable for holding expendable resources such as fuel and armaments. Nacelles may be used to house equipment that will only function remote from the fuselage, for example the Boeing E-3 Sentry radar is housed in a nacelle called a radome.

Other uses
 
Edward Turner used the term to describe his styling device introduced in 1949 to tidy the area around the headlamp and instrument panel of his Triumph Speed Twin, Thunderbird and Tiger 100 motorcycles. This styling device was much copied within the British industry thereafter, although Czech motorcycle manufacturer Česká Zbrojovka Strakonice was using it beforehand. Indeed, the Royal Enfield Bullet still retains its version, the 'casquette', on its current models. The last Triumphs to sport nacelles were the 1966 models of the 6T Triumph Thunderbird 650, 5TA Triumph Speed Twin 500, and 3TA Triumph Twenty One 350.
The generator and gearbox "shell" – with rotator shaft – on a horizontal-axis wind turbine (HAWT).
A forward projection of a catamaran's bridgedeck designed to soften the impact of seas or make more space inside the cabin.
Federation spacecraft in the Star Trek franchise usually feature warp-drive nacelles.

Design considerations
The primary design issue with aircraft-mounted nacelles is streamlining to minimize drag so nacelles are mounted on slender pylons. This can cause issues with routing the necessary conduits required for the equipment mounted within the nacelle to connect to the aircraft through such a narrow space. This is especially a concern with nacelles housing engines, as the fuel lines and control lines for multiple engine functions must all go through the pylon. 
It is often necessary for nacelles to be asymmetrical, but aircraft designers try to keep asymmetrical elements to a minimum to reduce operator maintenance costs associated with having two sets of parts for either side of the aircraft.

References 

Aircraft components